Elrick is a small village on the A944 road  west of the city of Aberdeen, Scotland. The name derives from a Gaelic word meaning a place where deer were driven for hunting. Elrick is also a common surname in the local area. Stagecoach operate services 5 & 6A to & from the city via Queens Road. Also 218 Alford -Foresterhill - Aberdeen.

It is to the south and west of Westhill.

References

External links 

Villages in Aberdeenshire
Westhill, Aberdeenshire